The Ice Breaker Road Race, held annually in Great Falls, Montana in April of each year, is a road race that draws over 3,000 walkers, joggers and marathoners. The race was established in 1980 and has been run annually ever since.

Prizes are awarded between the top finishers in the 5-mile (TAC-RRCA Certified) and 3-mile races.

References

External links
Ice Breaker Road Race Website

Recurring sporting events established in 1980
5-mile runs
1980 establishments in Montana
Sports in Great Falls, Montana